The Sound is a Chinese reality television competition that first aired on Hunan TV on January 6, 2018. The show, hosted by Wáng Kǎi, tests the dubbing and performing abilities of artists. The first episode was taped on December 19, 2017, and premiered on December 30, 2017. It aired officially on Saturdays at 10:00 p.m. on Hunan TV after The Inn.

Zhu Yawen was the season's champion.

Rules 
The show has 11 episodes—nine regular competitions and two rounds for the season finale.

For every regular competition, there are four actors or voice actors who compete against each other. Five or six new observers try to guess who the four contestants are. Every episode has three rounds of competition. For the first two rounds, the contestants dub behind the scene. For the third round, they perform on stage. An audience of 300 votes and decides who is the night's winner. The winner then advances to the season finale.

Assistant host, Sheng, is the only one who knows the identity of all the contestants before they perform on stage.

Result

Competition details

References

External links 
 The Sound Weibo

Chinese television shows